Sergey Panteleev (born 4 July 1951, Zapolye, Babayevsky District) is a Russian political figure and a deputy of the 7th and 8th State Dumas.
 
From 1973 to 2016, Panteleev worked at the Kirov Plant in Leningrad. In 2016, he was elected deputy of the 7th State Duma. Since September 2021, he has served as deputy of the 8th State Duma from the Saint Petersburg constituency.

References
 

 

1951 births
Living people
Communist Party of the Russian Federation members
21st-century Russian politicians
Eighth convocation members of the State Duma (Russian Federation)
Seventh convocation members of the State Duma (Russian Federation)
People from Vologda Oblast